Final Account is a 2020 German-language documentary film directed and produced by Luke Holland, who died shortly after post-production was completed on June 10, 2020. The film follows the last living generation of German participants in Adolf Hitler's Third Reich.

Final Account premiered at the 77th Venice International Film Festival on September 2, 2020. It was released on May 21, 2021, by Focus Features.

Synopsis
Over a decade in the making, the film raises questions about authority, conformity, complicity and perpetration, national identity, and responsibility, as men and women ranging from former SS members to civilians in never-before-seen interviews reckon with – in very different ways – their memories, perceptions and personal appraisals of their own roles in the Nazi war crimes.

Luke Holland, the late British filmmaker, interviewed over 300 elderly people - men and women from Germany and Austria - who, directly or indirectly, participated in the Third Reich, if only as witnesses (and if one considers that a witness is also a participant, more particularly if he or she witnesses atrocities and does nothing about it, insofar as anything could be done). Some of the interviewees took an active part in the Nazi regime: they were soldiers in the regular army (Wehrmacht) but, also, several were members of the elite corps of the SS, who were, in many ways, the backbone of the Nazi regime. Among the SS soldiers, some were officers and some were camp guards, guarding concentration and extermination camps where Jews and other inmates were worked to death and murdered. Others were farmers, local villagers, tradesmen, and so on. 

The first part of the film shows the level of indoctrination of the youth under the regime, which also explains what followed: from an early age, children and then teenagers (from the age of 10 or so) were enrolled in Nazi youth organisations (such as the Hitler Youth, from age 14). The aim was to brainwash them into being good Nazis and, for the boys, eager soldiers. In the main, it seemed to work very well from the standpoint of the Nazi regime. 

Of course, the key questions are asked, sooner or later, in the interviews. What did the interviewee know and what did he or she do? Did the interviewee take part in any atrocities? Did the interviewee know that atrocities were being committed all the time by the Nazi regime? Why did no one try to stop the Nazi killing machine, or hardly anyone, out of the millions of Germans who lived at the time - many of whom undoubtedly supported the regime?

This is, of course, the issue of guilt and responsibility: at what point does a witness become complicit in what he or she witnesses; and at what point does one become a perpetrator? These are tricky questions. Some of the interviewees are quite aware that they may be considered complicit in the crimes of the Third Reich, or even direct perpetrators. One in particular expresses profound shame. Others are more ambivalent. One interviewee cuts the interview short when the issue of his guilt is raised in a specific manner, as if he was aware of the risk of prosecution for war crimes... A couple are in complete denial: on the contrary, they are still "proud" to have served the Fatherland and to have been part of an elite military unit, the SS.

We hear the familiar denials, to the effect that many of the witnesses argue that they did not know what was going on (especially, in the extermination camps) and, of course, they did not take part. But it turns out many of them were involved, directly or not, like the bookkeeper who is interviewed. It is clear that most of the interviewees, apart from the few who are in complete denial, know, deep down, that they will carry the guilt and shame for what happened under the Nazis to their grave. As one interviewee puts it, he would not be a "perpetrator" if he had said "no", but he never said "no": like other people, he "went along" with what was going on.

What is unusual is that Luke Holland managed to make a film about the Third Reich and the Holocaust as seen through German eyes, as he succeeded in getting elderly Germans to talk about what they saw and what they did at the time. There are some truly chilling moments, such as the scene in school, today, where you realize that some young Germans do not understand at all what happened under Nazism: one young German is even prepared to berate a former SS camp guard who has come to his school to testify, as the youngster argues that the elderly man cannot possibly feel "ashamed" of what was done in his name under the Nazis.

Production
Beginning in 2008, Luke Holland conducted over 300 interviews with witnesses, guards, farmers, soldiers and participants of Adolf Hitler's Third Reich. Holland began working on the project after discovering his grandparents were murdered in a concentration camp, and his mother had fled Austria before the Germans arrived. Holland knew that many interviewees were skeptical and hesitant to go on camera because they did not want to share what they knew or were responsible for. In June 2020, Holland died after the film had cleared post-production.

Release
The film had its world premiere at the 77th Venice International Film Festival on September 2, 2020. In January 2021, Focus Features acquired distribution rights to the film, and set it for a May 21, 2021, release.  The film was released in the United Kingdom on 3December 2021.

Reception
The review aggregator Rotten Tomatoes gives the film a 93% approval rating, based on 71 reviews, with an average rating of 7.9/10. The website's consensus reads, "Final Account falls shy of the definitive statement suggested by its title, but the belated reckoning on display remains chillingly valuable viewing." According to Metacritic, which sampled 17 critics and calculated a weighted average score of 76 out of 100, the film received "generally favorable reviews".

References

External links
 
 
 

2020 films
American documentary films
British documentary films
2020 documentary films
Participant (company) films
Focus Features films
Documentary films about the Holocaust
2020s American films
2020s British films